Krestovsky Stadium, known as Gazprom Arena for sponsorship reasons, is a retractable roof stadium with a retractable pitch in the western portion of Krestovsky Island in Saint Petersburg, Russia, which serves as home for FC Zenit Saint Petersburg. The stadium was opened in 2017 for the FIFA Confederations Cup. It is called Saint Petersburg Stadium during major international tournaments, including the 2017 FIFA Confederations Cup, 2018 FIFA World Cup, and UEFA Euro 2020. It was to host the 2022 UEFA Champions League Final, but as a result of the Russian invasion of Ukraine, UEFA moved the final out of Russia and to the Stade de France in Saint-Denis, a suburb of Paris.

History
The stadium was built as one of the venues for the 2018 FIFA World Cup. The competition between architectural projects was won by Kisho Kurokawa's "The Spaceship". The design of the stadium is a modified and enlarged version of Toyota Stadium in Toyota City, Japan, which was also designed by Kurokawa. The stadium was built on the location where the former Kirov Stadium used to stand before it was demolished. The capacity of 56,196 seats was increased to 68,000 seats for the World Cup. It also has 104 luxuriously designed skyboxes.

In 2005 the planning of the stadium began. Initial construction work began in late 2008.

In January 2009 The St. Petersburg Times reported that the project was now to be funded by the city government of St Petersburg, with Gazprom switching to build a separate skyscraper project. The City Hall had to step in after Gazprom declined to invest any further money into the stadium's construction. Before the stadium was named Sankt Petersburg in October 2015, it was known under the names Zenit Arena, Gazprom Arena and Piter Arena.

On 25 July 2016 the general contractor, Inzhtransstroy-Spb, issued a statement that the city authorities have failed to pay 1 billion rubles ($15.8 million at the current exchange rate) worth of construction work and stopped the work. The next day the contract was terminated. On 1 August there were reports of wind damage to parts of the metal sheathing, and a flood.

In the end of August 2016, the new general contractor, Metrostroy, resumed construction works on the site.

In April 2017 the work on the stadium was completed. The total cost of the stadium amounted to 24 billion rubles. The first official match held at the stadium was the Russian Premier League game between FC Zenit Saint Petersburg and FC Ural on 22 April 2017. Branislav Ivanović scored the first goal in the stadium's history.

On 17 June 2017, the first game of 2017 FIFA Confederations Cup was held on the stadium with the Group A match between the host Russia and New Zealand.

On 2 July 2017, the 2017 FIFA Confederations Cup Final was held at the stadium between Chile and Germany, becoming the most attended match of the tournament and also setting the record attendance for the stadium.

On February 15, 2018, the government of Saint Petersburg signed a contract for the rights and use of the stadium with Zenit Arena LLC, which is a subsidiary of JSC football club Zenit.

On December 16, 2018, the Stadium hosted a Channel One Cup Russia – Finland (5-0) hockey match. 81,000 spectators watched the game and set a record attendance in domestic and European ice hockey.

On August 2, 2019, Rammstein played a concert on its Euro-Stadion-Tour in the stadium.

After the 2022 Russian invasion of Ukraine, it was announced that the 2022 UEFA Champions League Final would be moved from the Gazprom Arena to the Stade de France.

2017 FIFA Confederations Cup

2018 FIFA World Cup
Saint Petersburg was one of the host venues, seven matches during the 2018 FIFA World Cup.

UEFA Euro 2020
On 19 September 2014, it was announced by UEFA that the stadium was chosen to host four UEFA Euro 2020 finals fixtures, three group games and a quarter-final match. On 23 April 2021, the stadium was given three additional group stage matches in Group E (Poland vs. Slovakia, Sweden vs. Slovakia and Sweden vs. Poland) following the removal of the Aviva Stadium in Dublin as a Euro 2020 host city due to the ongoing COVID-19 pandemic in the Republic of Ireland.

UEFA Champions League Matches
On 24 September 2019, UEFA announced that the stadium would host the 2021 UEFA Champions League Final. However, due to adjustments of the 2020 final caused by the COVID-19 pandemic in Europe, their hosting time was pushed back a year to 2022. As a result of the Russian invasion of Ukraine on 24 February, UEFA called an extraordinary meeting of the Executive Committee, and the next day, UEFA confirmed that the final would be moved to the Stade de France in Saint-Denis, a suburb of Paris.

UEFA Europa League Matches

Conditions for spectators with disabilities 
Saint Petersburg Arena offers 560 seats for people with disabilities, 266 of them are for wheelchair users. Moreover, the stadium design includes special lobbies, elevators and ramps to ensure accessibility to spectators with limited mobility.

Safety and security 
The stadium has been fully prepared for the FIFA World Cup games in accordance with the FIFA requirements for capacity and security. The stadium is equipped with a video surveillance and identification system that makes it possible to detect any troublemakers and fans who are not allowed to enter.

References

External links

 Official website
 Live webcam of stadium construction at http://ingtransstroy.ru
 Updated renders of the stadium after project adjustment
 Section about the stadium on the official website of Zenit

FC Zenit Saint Petersburg
Football venues in Russia
Sports venues in Saint Petersburg
Retractable-pitch stadiums
Retractable-roof stadiums
Retractable-roof stadiums in Europe
2018 FIFA World Cup stadiums
2017 FIFA Confederations Cup stadiums
UEFA Euro 2020 stadiums
Sports venues completed in 2017
2017 establishments in Russia